The Deworm the World Initiative is a program led by a nonprofit Evidence Action that works to support governments in developing school-based deworming programs in Kenya, India, Ethiopia, and Vietnam.

Deworm the World works with the Schistosomiasis Control Initiative in supporting Ethiopia's national school-based deworming program.

History

The initiative was originally an independent organization called Deworm the World, co-founded by development economist Michael Kremer.

GiveWell

In November 2015, GiveWell recommended that Good Ventures donate $10.8 million to the organization, and identified a funding gap of $11.4 million for the organization, though the entire funding for the organization's planned 2016 activities were covered.

In November 2016, GiveWell recommended that Good Ventures donate $4.5 million to the organization, out of Good Ventures' $50 million budget for GiveWell's top charities.

References

External links
 

Health charities in the United States
Parasitic animals
Organizations associated with effective altruism